Spotlight is the third extended play from South Korean boy band Up10tion. It was released on April 18, 2016, by TOP Media. The album consists of seven tracks, including the lead single "Attention".

Commercial performance
The EP sold 62,848+ copies in South Korea. It peaked at number 4 on the Korean Gaon Chart.

Track listing

Charts

References 

2016 EPs
Korean-language EPs
Kakao M EPs
Up10tion EPs